"When I Have Fears" is an Elizabethan sonnet by the English Romantic poet John Keats. The 14-line poem is written in iambic pentameter and consists of three quatrains and a couplet. Keats wrote the poem between 22 and 31 January 1818. It was published (posthumously) in 1848 in Life, Letters, and Literary Remains, of John Keats by  Richard Monckton Milnes.

The poem

Themes and language
"When I Have Fears" primarily explores death, the fear of it, and what it prevents Keats from doing. Using the phrase "cease to be" shows an emphasis on the life Keats will miss out on rather than simply death itself. The repetition of "before" represents the anxieties Keats has about what he cannot achieve before death. He fears he will no longer be able to write, witness the beauty of the world, or experience love or fame once he dies. While the poem ends with a slight resolution, with "Love and Fame" no longer mattering to Keats, it is a resolution found in isolation and excessive thought. The two do not matter to Keats because death is inevitable and will prevent him from making those achievements, so they sink away from Keats.

References to nature also appear throughout the poem, including harvesting grain, the night sky, clouds, and the shore. Nature is a common theme in Romantic poetry, but in Keats' poem it demonstrates how essential and natural writing is to his being. The shore and water that love and fame sink within represent an expanse of fears that sit before Keats, giving the natural world a darker theme in those lines.

The theme of creating coincides with references to nature and beauty. The first quatrain equates writing to harvesting grain. Thoughts are tangible items to be grown into "high-piled books," as Keats feels he can allow his ideas to flourish if he only had a long enough life. The second quatrain contains more abstract concepts. Stars, cloudy symbols, shadows, reflect the intangible beauty of the world which Keats can also not attempt to understand because of a life cut short. The couplet shows abstract concepts of Love and Fame becoming tangible, though they sink to nothingness as Keats realizes he has no time to achieve them.

Analysis
The first four lines express Keats' fear that he will die before he has written all the works he hopes to, "before [his] pen has glean'd [his] teeming brain." The symbols of the night sky and clouds that Keats "may never live to trace" can represent many things. The first is simply Keats' desire for literary expression and interpretation of the world around him. Another, though, is more philosophical. Keats' use of "shadows" can connect to Plato's Allegory of the Cave, which then represents his desire to understand life itself. The "magic hand of chance" may further represent fate as a function of life. Keats is condemned to a short life by chance, and because of that he will remain unable to trace or understand how fate functions.

The "fair creature of an hour," according to Richard Woodhouse, the man who advised Keats' publishers on legal and literary matters, refers to a woman Keats encountered at Vauxhall Gardens. Keats' reflection on this woman may represent his preoccupation with beauty and his fear of no longer witnessing beauty, in the form of a woman or nature, once he dies. She also represents Keats' fear of loss and being unable to experience love once he dies.

The final three lines where Keats stands alone and contemplates the end of life may represent a passive acceptance that life must end. Love and fame do not matter and cannot be achieved anyway once Keats dies.

Rhyme scheme
"When I Have Fears" follows a rhyme scheme of ABAB CDCD EFEF GG (Shakespeare Sonnet). Shahidha Bari notes the rhyme scheme may reflect expectation. Readers expect the lines to rhyme with each other, as Keats anticipates the end of his life. The couplet and rhyme signals the end of the poem, as death signals the end of life.

Biographical connections
Keats, who died of tuberculosis at the age of 25, is often cited as fearing his own death. The fear may come from Keats' work as a medical student, where his sympathy for patients, as his friend Charles Brown believed, hindered his work. Keats was aware of the harm that could come to patients if he made any mistakes. Keats' fear of death is also present for his own life, not just his patients.

This fear is evident on his gravestone, with the words "Here lies one whose name was writ in water." The epitaph, which Keats requested on his deathbed, reflects Keats' fears of death and anger with fate, as "When I Have Fears" does. The last three lines of the poem which describe "the shore" and state, "Till Love and Fame to nothingness do sink" may relate to the reference to water in Keats' epitaph. His name will sink in water as the fame of writing will.

Similarities to Shakespeare
William Flesch notes the poem's echoes of Shakespeare's Antony and Cleopatra. Comparisons have also been made to Shakespeare's Sonnet 60 for references to time, endings, and the sea and to Sonnet 64 for references to time destroying man-made creations.

References

External links
 
 

Sonnets
Poetry by John Keats